Munnerlyn is an unincorporated community in Burke County, in the U.S. state of Georgia.

History
A post office called Munnerlyn was established in 1880, and remained in operation until 1960. It is unclear whether the community is named after Colonel John D. Munnerlyn, a local attorney, or after Charles James Munnerlyn, a Georgia politician. Early variant names were "Lumpkins Station", "Thomas", and "Thomas Station".

References

Unincorporated communities in Burke County, Georgia
Unincorporated communities in Georgia (U.S. state)